John Wilson Haanstra (May 12, 1926 – August 16, 1969) was an electrical engineer and a computer industry executive. Haanstra was notable for his chairmanship of IBM's SPREAD task force whose work led to the creation of the System/360 product line.

Early career
Born in San Francisco, California, Haanstra graduated from the University of California, Berkeley in 1949 with a degree in electrical engineering. In 1950 he went to work for IBM in Poughkeepsie, New York. During the Korean War he was recalled to serve in the Navy. Following his discharge he rejoined IBM in 1952 in the San Jose Laboratory. He was responsible for designing the IBM 305 RAMAC, "the first commercial computer that used a moving-head hard disk drive", announced in 1956.

1401 and System/360
In 1957 he was promoted to assistant general manager of General Products Division (GPD), and in 1961 he became president of the division.  There he oversaw the deployment of the highly successful 1401 computer system. Also in 1961 IBM vice president T. Vincent Learson established the 12-person SPREAD task group, with Haanstra as chairman and Bob O. Evans as vice chairman. The result, a 26-page report, was published in December, 1961, and "became the basis for the System/360 series and its operating system." Haanstra agreed that GPD would produce the low-end model of System/360 that became the Model 30. However, he was not fully on board with the "New Product Line" (NPL) as System/360 was known at the time.  To compete with the newly announced 1401-compatible Honeywell 200 system, Haanstra  had GPD secretly produce a plan for a much faster 1401S system, which he presented to IBM President Thomas Watson Jr. in January, 1964, along with a suggestion that he delay the introduction of the Model 30. Although Watson praised the plan, in the event Haanstra was removed as president of GPD, and the 360 project continued as planned.

Later career at IBM
Despite his demotion (Evans calls it "IBM purgatory"), in 1965 Haanstra was appointed president of IBM's newly formed Systems Development Division (SDD), responsible for all IBM computer research and development. Later that year, however, delays in System/360 manufacturing caused Watson to remove Haanstra from SDD and assign him to a committee called the "four horsemen" along with John Gibson, Clarence E. Frizzell, and Henry E. Cooley. The committee was to coordinate all IBM manufacturing  and laboratory locations and "decide how to meet System/360 manufacturing commitments."  In 1966 Bob Evans lobbied and had Haanstra appointed vice president of the IBM Federal Systems Division (FSD) Federal Systems Center.

General Electric
In August 1967 Haanstra left IBM and went to work for General Electric's computer division in Phoenix, Arizona as special assistant to the head of GE's Information Systems Division, and in 1968 he was appointed head of advanced planning

At General Electric Haanstra contributed to the design of Project Charlie, a line of medium sized machines intended to compete with System/360. He recommended the development of microcoded peripheral controllers rather than hard wired units. It is likely that it was on his recommendation that emitter-coupled logic (ECL) was chosen as the technology to be used for the new system.

In 1968 Haanstra assumed responsibility for the "GE655" project in Phoenix, later the GE6000 that became the Honeywell 6000 series.

Death
In 1969, flying his private plane back to Phoenix from a trip to Vermont, Hannstra, his wife, June (Hill) Haanstra, and their son Glenn were killed when the plane crashed near Clines Corners, New Mexico on August 16, 1969, on the final leg between Oklahoma City, Oklahoma, and Phoenix. Two other children were not traveling with the couple at the time.

Notes

References

1926 births
1969 deaths
University of California, Berkeley alumni
American electrical engineers
IBM employees
General Electric employees